Württemberg, a hilly rather than a mountainous region, forms part of the South German tableland, also referred to as the Swiss plateau. The undulating fertile terraces of Upper and Lower Swabia typify this agricultural region. Estimates of land form proportions count a quarter of the entire area as plain, less than one-third as mountainous, and nearly one-half as hill-country.

Average elevation above sea level: 
Lowest point: Bottingen , where the Neckar leaves Württemberg
Highest point: the Katzenkopf , on the Hornisgrinde, on the western border

Orography

The chief mountains include the Black Forest on the west, the Swabian Alb or Rauhe Alb stretching across the middle of the area from south-west to north-east, and the Adelegg mountains in the extreme south-east, adjoining the Allgäu Alps in Bavaria. The Rauhe Alb (or Alp) slopes gradually down into the plateau on its southern side, but on the north it appears sometimes rugged and steep, its line broken by isolated projecting hills. The highest summits, the Lemberg , the Ober-Hohenberg  and the Plettenberg , lie in the southwest.

To the south of the Swabian Alb the plateau of Upper Swabia stretches to Lake Constance and eastwards across the Iller into Bavaria. Between the Alb and the Black Forest in the north-west lie the fertile terraces of Lower Swabia, which continue north-eastwards into Franconia.

Hydrography

About 70% of Württemberg belongs to the basin of the Rhine, and about 30% to that of the Danube. The main river, the Neckar, flows northward for  through the area to join the Rhine, draining with its tributaries (notably the rivers Rems, Kocher and Jagst) 57% of the former state of Württemberg. The Tauber in the north-east joins the Main; the Argen and Schussen in the south flow into Lake Constance.

The lakes of Württemberg, except those in the Black Forest, all lie south of the Danube. The largest is the Federsee (2.6 km2), near Bad Buchau. About one-fifth of Lake Constance forms Württemberg territory.

Mineral springs abound; most famously at the spa of Wildbad, in the Black Forest.

References

 

Württemberg